The 2005 VCU Rams baseball team represented Virginia Commonwealth University during the 2005 NCAA Division I baseball season. The Rams played their home games at The Diamond as a member of the Colonial Athletic Association. They were led by head coach Paul Keyes, in his eleventh year as head coach.

Previous season

The 2004 VCU Rams baseball team notched a 34–24 (14–10) regular-season record.

References 

2005 Colonial Athletic Association baseball season
2007
2005 in sports in Virginia
Vcu
2005